
Gmina Lubaczów is a rural gmina (administrative district) in Lubaczów County, Subcarpathian Voivodeship, in south-eastern Poland, on the border with Ukraine. Its seat is the town of Lubaczów, although the town is not part of the territory of the gmina.

The largest communities in Gmina Lubaczów are Lisie Jamy and Basznia Dolna.

Villages
Gmina Lubaczów contains the villages and settlements of Antoniki, Bałaje, Basznia Dolna, Basznia Górna, Borowa Góra, Budomierz, Dąbków, Dąbrowa, Hurcze, Huta Kryształowa, Karolówka, Krowica Hołodowska, Krowica Lasowa, Krowica Sama, Lisie Jamy, Młodów, Mokrzyca, Opaka, Piastowo, Podlesie, Szczutków, Tymce, Wólka Krowicka and Załuże.

Neighbouring gminas
Gmina Lubaczów is bordered by the town of Lubaczów and by the gmina of Horyniec-Zdrój. It also borders Ukraine.

References

Polish official population figures 2006

Lubaczow
Lubaczów County